Torquil was an Irish priest in the late 12th century: the first recorded Archdeacon of Dublin in Ireland.

References

Archdeacons of Dublin
12th-century Irish Roman Catholic priests